This article details the fixtures and results of the UAE national football team in 1974. 

The national team was represented at the 4th Arabian Gulf Cup where they finished in 4th place after getting through the group stages of the competition.

Schedule

Friendly

4th Arabian Gulf Cup

4th Arabian Gulf Cup

4th Arabian Gulf Cup

4th Arabian Gulf Cup

National team
National team
1974
United